Richard Morris Christiansen (born July 25, 1931) was a Canadian football player who played for the BC Lions. He played college football at the University of Arizona. His two sons, Brian and Gregg also played college football; Brian at Arizona and Gregg at UCLA.

References

Living people
1931 births
Canadian football ends
Arizona Wildcats football players
BC Lions players